Barbara Fonseca (born  29 November 1990 Sens) is a French road cyclist. She competed at the 2022 Tour de France Femmes, with St. Michel–Auber93 .

References 

1990 births
Living people
French female cyclists
Sportspeople from Sens
20th-century French women
21st-century French women
Cyclists from Bourgogne-Franche-Comté